is a former Japanese football player.

Club statistics

References

External links

JEF United Chiba

1988 births
Living people
Association football people from Kyoto Prefecture
Japanese footballers
J1 League players
J2 League players
JEF United Chiba players
Association football forwards